Diamond is an unincorporated community in Gilmer County, in the U.S. state of Georgia.

History
A post office called Diamond was established in 1879, and remained in operation until 1953. The community took its name from the nearby Diamond company mines.

References

Unincorporated communities in Gilmer County, Georgia
Unincorporated communities in Georgia (U.S. state)